Brock Orville Larson (born August 23, 1977) is a retired American professional mixed martial artist who competed in the Welterweight and Middleweight divisions. A professional competitor from 2002 until 2016, Larson has formerly competed for the UFC, the WEC, and ONE FC.

Background
Larson is from Brainerd, Minnesota and was raised on a beef farm. Larson began competing in wrestling from a young age, continuing with the sport at Brainerd High School. Later while attending Itasca Community College, Larson was introduced to Brazilian jiu-jitsu by a friend. The two later competed in a Minnesota Martial Arts Academy submission tournament, with each winning and earning invites to train with future UFC Lightweight Champion Sean Sherk. Larson also defeated former UFC fighter Tom Speer in an all-grappling match.

Mixed martial arts career

Early career
Larson made his professional mixed martial arts debut in 2002 and compiled an undefeated record of 15-0 while competing in the regional circuit before being signed by the UFC.

Ultimate Fighting Championship
Larson made his UFC debut at UFC Fight Night 2 on October 3, 2005 in a Middleweight bout against Jon Fitch. Larson lost via unanimous decision.

After winning his next six consecutive fights, Larson returned to the promotion at UFC Fight Night 7 on December 13, 2006 where he faced Keita Nakamura. Larson won via unanimous decision.

World Extreme Cagefighting
Larson then transitioned into the WEC, making his promotional debut at WEC 26: Condit vs. Alessio against Erik Apple on April 24, 2007. Larson won via kimura submission in the first round. Larson made his next appearance on June 3, 2007 against Kevin Knabjian at WEC 28 and won via TKO 27 seconds into the first round. With a 2-0 promotional record and a nine-fight winning streak, Larson was offered a fight for the WEC Welterweight Championship against then-champion Carlos Condit at WEC 29 on August 5, 2007 and was defeated in the first round via armbar submission.

In December 2008, the WEC Welterweight division merged with the UFC's Welterweight division after the promotion decided to focus on lower weight classes.

UFC return
Larson made his UFC return against Jesse Sanders, and won via rear-naked choke submission at UFC Fight Night: Condit vs. Kampmann on April 1, 2009.

Larson then fought at UFC 98, defeating Mike Pyle by arm-triangle choke submission in round one, earning Submission of the Night honors.

At UFC 106 he fought Brian Foster. Larson had two points deducted in the first round for an illegal kick and an illegal knee before being defeated in the second round by technical knockout on November 21, 2009, at UFC 106. Following the loss, Larson was cut by the UFC.

Post-UFC
After going 3-0 in regional competition after his UFC release, Larson faced future Strikeforce Welterweight Champion Tarec Saffiedine on September 11, 2010 at Shark Fights 13 and lost via unanimous decision.

Larson next faced Gabe Wallbridge on October 29, 2010 at King of the Cage: Mainstream. He won by submission due to strikes in the first round.

ONE FC
Larson was signed by ONE FC and made his promotional debut against Melvin Manhoef at ONE Fighting Championship: Kings and Champions on April 5, 2013 and won via unanimous decision.

Larson then faced Nobutatsu Suzuki for the inaugural ONE FC Welterweight Championship on March 14, 2014 at ONE FC: War of Nations. He lost the fight via unanimous decision.

Legacy FC and retirement
Larson made his debut for Legacy Fighting Championship in July 2015.  He challenged Derrick Krantz for the Legacy FC Welterweight Championship, but ended up losing the bout via knockout in the third round.

In his second fight for the promotion, Larson faced Travis Coyle on February 5, 2016 at Legacy FC 51.  He was in trouble early on as Coyle locked on a guillotine choke; however, Larson survived the various submission attempts and ended up winning the fight via TKO in the first round.  Post-fight, Larson's team awarded him with a personalized belt marking his years of competition from 2002-2016 and he retired from active MMA competition in order to concentrate on coaching.

Personal life
Larson has three children. Before fighting professionally, Larson worked in road construction. Brock currently is the head professor at START BJJ MN.

Championships and accomplishments
Ultimate Fighting Championship
Submission of the Night (One time) vs. Mike Pyle 
World Extreme Cagefighting
Knockout of the Night (One time)  vs. Carlo Prater

Mixed martial arts record

|-
| Win
| align=center| 42–10
|Travis Coyle
|TKO (punches)
|Legacy FC 51: Ramos vs. Vasquez
|
|align=center|1
|align=center|2:03
|Hinckley, Minnesota, United States
|
|-
| Loss
| align=center| 41–10
|Derrick Krantz
|KO (punches)
|Legacy FC 43: Larson vs. Krantz
|
|align=center|3
|align=center|2:38
|Hinckley, Minnesota, United States
|
|-
| Win
| align=center| 41–9
| Kyle Olsen
| TKO (punches)
| KOTC: Bad Blood
| 
| align=center| 1
| align=center| 1:41
| Saint Michael, North Dakota, United States
|
|-
| Win
| align=center| 40–9
| Eddie Larrea
| TKO (punches)
| KOTC: Fighting Spirit
| 
| align=center| 1
| align=center| 1:57
| Saint Michael, North Dakota, United States
|
|-
| Loss
| align=center| 39–9
| Roan Carneiro
| Decision (unanimous)
| rowspan=3|BattleGrounds MMA 5: O.N.E.
| rowspan=3|
| align=center| 3
| align=center| 5:00
| rowspan=3|Tulsa, Oklahoma, United States
| 
|-
| Win
| align=center| 39–8
| Joe Ray
| Decision (unanimous)
| align=center| 3
| align=center| 5:00
| 
|-
| Win
| align=center| 38–8
| Cody McKenzie
| Submission (arm-triangle choke)
| align=center| 2
| align=center| 1:43
| 
|-
| Loss
| align=center| 37–8
| Nobutatsu Suzuki
| Decision (unanimous)
| ONE FC: War of Nations
| 
| align=center| 5
| align=center| 5:00
| Kuala Lampur, Malaysia
| 
|-
| Win
| align=center| 37–7
| Melvin Manhoef
| Decision (unanimous)
| ONE FC: Kings and Champions
| 
| align=center| 3
| align=center| 5:00
| Kallang, Singapore
| 
|-
| Win
| align=center| 36–7
| Eduardo Pamplona
| Decision (unanimous)
| Resurrection Fighting Alliance 6
| 
| align=center| 3
| align=center| 5:00
| Kansas City, Missouri, United States
| 
|-
| Win
| align=center| 35–7
| Anthony Lemon
| Submission (armbar)
| KOTC: Fire and Ice
| 
| align=center| 1
| align=center| 3:20
| Walker, Minnesota United States
| 
|-
| Win
| align=center| 34–7
| Lucas St. Clair
| Submission (Von Flue choke)
| Cage Fighting Extreme 38
| 
| align=center| 1
| align=center| 1:00
| Sauk Rapids, Minnesota, United States
| 
|-
| Loss
| align=center| 33–7
| Antônio Braga Neto
| Submission (kneebar)
| MMAAD: MMA Against Dengue 2
| 
| align=center| 1
| align=center| 1:04
| Rio de Janeiro, Brazil
| 
|-
| Loss
| align=center| 33–6
| Eric Davila
| KO (punch)
| Extreme Challenge 188: Larson vs. Davila
| 
| align=center| 1
| align=center| 0:07
| Minneapolis, Minnesota, United States
| 
|-
| Win
| align=center| 33–5
| Gabe Wallbridge
| TKO (submission to punches)
| KOTC: Mainstream
| 
| align=center| 1
| align=center| 1:13
| Morton, Minnesota, United States
| 
|-
| Loss
| align=center| 32–5
| Tarec Saffiedine
| Decision (unanimous)
| Shark Fights 13: Jardine vs Prangley
| 
| align=center| 3
| align=center| 5:00
| Amarillo, Texas, United States
| 
|- 
| Win
| align=center| 32–4
| Eddie Larrea
| Submission (kimura)
| Gladiator Evolution/Cage Fighting Xtreme
| 
| align=center| 1
| align=center| 2:05
| Brockton, Massachusetts, United States
| 
|-
| Win
| align=center| 31–4
| Nick Almen
| TKO (punches)
| CFX: Cage Fighting Xtreme
| 
| align=center| 1
| align=center| 0:30
| Red Lake, Minnesota, United States
| 
|-
| Win
| align=center| 30–4
| Brian Green
| Submission (rear-naked choke)
| CFX / XKL: Mayhem in Minneapolis
| 
| align=center| 1
| align=center| 4:39
| Minneapolis, Minnesota, United States
| 
|-
| Loss
| align=center| 29–4
| Brian Foster
| TKO (submission to punches)
| UFC 106
| 
| align=center| 2
| align=center| 3:25
| Las Vegas, Nevada, United States
| 
|-
| Loss
| align=center| 29–3
| Mike Pierce
| Decision (unanimous)
| UFC Fight Night: Diaz vs. Guillard
| 
| align=center| 3
| align=center| 5:00
| Oklahoma City, Oklahoma, United States
| 
|-
| Win
| align=center| 29–2
| Mike Pyle
| Submission (arm-triangle choke)
| UFC 98
| 
| align=center| 1
| align=center| 3:06
| Las Vegas, Nevada, United States
| 
|-
| Win
| align=center| 28–2
| Jesse Sanders
| Submission (rear-naked choke)
| UFC Fight Night: Condit vs. Kampmann
| 
| align=center| 1
| align=center| 2:01
| Nashville, Tennessee, United States
| 
|-
| Win
| align=center| 27–2
| Carlo Prater
| KO (punches)
| WEC 35: Condit vs. Miura
| 
| align=center| 1
| align=center| 0:37
| Las Vegas, Nevada, United States
| 
|-
| Win
| align=center| 26–2
| John Alessio
| DQ (knee to downed fighter)
| WEC 33: Marshall vs. Stann
| 
| align=center| 1
| align=center| 1:50
| Las Vegas, Nevada, United States
| 
|-
| Win
| align=center| 25–2
| Troy Allison
| Submission (rear-naked choke)
| CFX 7: Brutal
| 
| align=center| 1
| align=center| N/A
| St. Cloud, Minnesota, United States
| 
|-
| Loss
| align=center| 24–2
| Carlos Condit
| Submission (armbar)
| WEC 29
| 
| align=center| 1
| align=center| 2:21
| Las Vegas, Nevada, United States
|  
|-
| Win
| align=center| 24–1
| Kevin Knabjian
| TKO (punches)
| WEC 28
| 
| align=center| 1
| align=center| 0:27
| Las Vegas, Nevada, United States
| 
|-
| Win
| align=center| 23–1
| Erik Apple
| Submission (kimura)
| WEC 26: Condit vs. Alessio
| 
| align=center| 1
| align=center| 3:43
| Las Vegas, Nevada, United States
| 
|-
| Win
| align=center| 22–1
| Keita Nakamura
| Decision (unanimous)
| UFC Fight Night: Sanchez vs. Riggs
| 
| align=center| 3
| align=center| 5:00
| San Diego, California, United States
|
|-
| Win
| align=center| 21–1
| Edward O'Daniel
| Submission (Von Flue choke)
| Extreme Challenge 70
| 
| align=center| 1
| align=center| 2:21
| Hayward, Wisconsin, United States
| 
|-
| Win
| align=center| 20–1
| Manuel Quiroz
| Submission (rear-naked choke)
| Extreme Challenge 67
| 
| align=center| 1
| align=center| 0:42
| Medina, Minnesota, United States
| 
|-
| Win
| align=center| 19–1
| Alex Carter
| TKO (submission to punches)
| CFX 4: Cage Fighting Xtreme 4
| 
| align=center| 1
| align=center| N/A
| Plymouth, Minnesota, United States
| 
|-
| Win
| align=center| 18–1
| Kenneth Allen
| Submission (guillotine choke)
| TCT: Twin Cities Throwdown
| 
| align=center| 1
| align=center| N/A
| Burnsville, Minnesota, United States
| 
|-
| Win
| align=center| 17–1
| Ray Perales
| Submission (rear-naked choke)
| IFC: Rumble on the River
| 
| align=center| 1
| align=center| 1:05
| Kearney, Nebraska, United States
| 
|-
| Win
| align=center| 16–1
| Shannon Ritch
| TKO (punches)
| Extreme Challenge 66
| 
| align=center| 1
| align=center| 1:16
| Medina, Minnesota, United States
| 
|-
| Loss
| align=center| 15–1
| Jon Fitch
| Decision (unanimous)
| UFC Ultimate Fight Night 2
| 
| align=center| 3
| align=center| 5:00
| Las Vegas, Nevada, United States
| 
|-
| Win
| align=center| 15–0
| Ryan McGivern
| Submission (keylock)
| rowspan=3|Extreme Challenge 63
| rowspan=3|
| align=center| 1
| align=center| 2:09
| rowspan=3|Hayward, Wisconsin, United States
| 
|-
| Win
| align=center| 14–0
| Ryan Jensen
| TKO (submission to punches)
| align=center| 1
| align=center| 1:39
| 
|-
| Win
| align=center| 13–0
| DaMarques Johnson
| Submission (keylock)
| align=center| 3
| align=center| 1:02
| 
|-
| Win
| align=center| 12–0
| Miguel Cooley
| TKO (submission to punches)
| CFX 3: Cage Fighting Xtreme 3
| 
| align=center| 1
| align=center| N/A
| Brainerd, Minnesota, United States
| 
|-
| Win
| align=center| 11–0
| Stephan Potvin
| Decision (unanimous)
| IFC WC 19: Warriors Challenge 19
| 
| align=center| 5
| align=center| 5:00
| Sault Ste Marie, Michigan, United States
| 
|-
| Win
| align=center| 10–0
| Darin Brudigan
| Submission (arm-triangle choke)
| XKK: Fridley
| 
| align=center| 2
| align=center| 4:50
| Fridley, Minnesota, United States
| 
|-
| Win 					
| align=center| 9–0
| Mark Smolinski
| TKO (punches)
| CFX 2: Cage Fighting Xtreme 2
| 
| align=center| 1
| align=center| N/A
| Brainerd, Minnesota, United States
| 
|-
| Win
| align=center| 8–0
| Miguel Cooley
| TKO (punches)
| ICC: Trials 2
| 
| align=center| 1
| align=center| N/A
| Rochester, Minnesota, United States
| 
|-
| Win 				
| align=center| 7–0
| Nick Beasley
| TKO (submission to punches)
| DFC 1: Dakota Fighting Championships 1
| 
| align=center| 1
| align=center| 1:04
| Fargo, North Dakota, United States
| 
|-
| Win
| align=center| 6–0
| James Fuller
| Submission (armbar)
| CFX 1: Cage Fighting Xtreme 1
| 
| align=center| 1
| align=center| N/A
| Brainerd, Minnesota, United States
| 
|-
| Win
| align=center| 5–0
| Alex Gasson
| Submission (armbar)
| rowspan=2|ICC: Trials
| rowspan=2|
| align=center| 2
| align=center| 4:13
| rowspan=2|Fridley, Minnesota, United States
| 
|-
| Win
| align=center| 4–0
| Brian Maceachern
| Submission (armbar)
| align=center| 1
| align=center| 1:56
| 
|-
| Win
| align=center| 3–0
| Kyle Olsen
| TKO (submission to punches)
| SS: Sabin Showdown
| 
| align=center| 1
| align=center| 2:20
| Moorhead, Minnesota, United States
| 
|-
| Win				
| align=center| 2–0
| Luke Caudillo
| Submission (keylock)
| IWW: Iowa Winter Warriors
| 
| align=center| N/A
| align=center| N/A
| Spirit Lake, Iowa, United States
| 
|-
| Win
| align=center| 1–0
| Josh Hartwell
| TKO (submission to punches)
| ARCF 7: American Reality Combat 7
| 
| align=center| 1
| align=center| 0:46
| Alexandria, Minnesota, United States
|

See also
List of male mixed martial artists
List of Brazilian jiu-jitsu practitioners

References

External links
 
 

1977 births
Living people
People from Brainerd, Minnesota
American male mixed martial artists
Mixed martial artists from Minnesota
People from Crow Wing County, Minnesota
Welterweight mixed martial artists
Middleweight mixed martial artists
Mixed martial artists utilizing wrestling
Mixed martial artists utilizing Brazilian jiu-jitsu
American practitioners of Brazilian jiu-jitsu
People awarded a black belt in Brazilian jiu-jitsu
Ultimate Fighting Championship male fighters